Rhopalothrix is a genus of ants in the subfamily Myrmicinae.

Species

 Rhopalothrix andersoni Longino & Boudinot, 2013
 Rhopalothrix apertor Longino & Boudinot, 2013
 Rhopalothrix atitlanica Longino & Boudinot, 2013
 Rhopalothrix ciliata Mayr, 1870
 Rhopalothrix diadema Brown & Kempf, 1960
 Rhopalothrix isthmica (Weber, 1941)
 Rhopalothrix kusnezovi Brown & Kempf, 1960
 Rhopalothrix megisthmica Longino & Boudinot, 2013
 Rhopalothrix nubilosa Longino & Boudinot, 2013
 Rhopalothrix orbis Taylor, 1968
 Rhopalothrix plaumanni Brown & Kempf, 1960
 Rhopalothrix stannardi Brown & Kempf, 1960
 Rhopalothrix subspatulata Longino & Boudinot, 2013
 Rhopalothrix therion Longino & Boudinot, 2013
 Rhopalothrix triumphalis Longino & Boudinot, 2013
 Rhopalothrix weberi Brown & Kempf, 1960

References

External links

Myrmicinae
Ant genera